Zoran Stamenić (born 3 August 1977) is a retired Croatia-born Serb footballer who played in Serbia, Hungary, Iceland, Norway and Croatia.

Clubs career
Born in Slavonski Brod, SR Croatia, SFR Yugoslavia, he played with FK ČSK Čelarevo in the Serbian lower league between 1998 and 2004. In summer 2004 he moved to Hungary and joined Budapest Honvéd FC playing in the Nemzeti Bajnokság I but during the winter break he returned to ČSK. During the winter break of the 2005–06 season, he moved to FK Mladost Apatin playing then in the Serbian First League, however at the end of the season they will gain promotion to the 2006–07 Serbian SuperLiga. In January 2008 he will move to Iceland and sign with Grindavik and play in the top league Úrvalsdeild during the seasons 2008 and 2009. In 2010, he moved to Norway and played with Klepp IL in Norwegian lower leagues. He was not eligible to play however.

In 2011, he would return to Iceland and play with BÍ/Bolungarvík the 2011 season.

After finishing his playing career with NK Bobota-Agrar he became a youth coach at Mladost Apatin.

References

1977 births
Living people
Sportspeople from Slavonski Brod
Serbs of Croatia
Association football defenders
Serbian footballers
FK ČSK Čelarevo players
Budapest Honvéd FC players
FK Mladost Apatin players
Zoran Stamenić
Zoran Stamenić
Nemzeti Bajnokság I players
Serbian SuperLiga players
Úrvalsdeild karla (football) players
1. deild karla players
Serbian expatriate footballers
Expatriate footballers in Hungary
Serbian expatriate sportspeople in Hungary
Expatriate footballers in Iceland
Serbian expatriate sportspeople in Iceland
Expatriate footballers in Norway
Serbian expatriate sportspeople in Norway